Choi Hyun-seo (born October 15, 2000), better known by his stage name Hiss, is a South Korean beatboxer and producer. Hiss is perhaps best known as runner up in the Grand Beatbox Battle 2017 and won in the Asia Beatbox Championship 2019. He is currently a member of the duo acapella, BEATPELLA. Hiss made his debut with released single JUMPIN on October 10, 2018.

Performance in competitions

Discography

Albums

Singles

As lead artist

As promotional singles

As collaborations

Filmography

Television shows

References

External links 
 Hiss official website
 

South Korean beatboxers
Living people
2000 births
People from Hwaseong, Gyeonggi